Wilde Acres is an unincorporated community in Frederick County, Virginia, United States. Wilde Acres is a planned community on the eastern face of Great North Mountain near the Mountain Falls on Fall Run.

References

Unincorporated communities in Frederick County, Virginia
Unincorporated communities in Virginia